

326001–326100 

|-bgcolor=#f2f2f2
| colspan=4 align=center | 
|}

326101–326200 

|-id=164
| 326164 Miketoomey ||  || Michael (Mike) Toomey (born 1971), a longtime supporter of Lowell Observatory. || 
|}

326201–326300 

|-id=290
| 326290 Akhenaten ||  || Akhenaten (reigned 1353–1336 BC), a pharaoh of the 18th Dynasty of Egypt who ruled for 17 years. || 
|}

326301–326400 

|-bgcolor=#f2f2f2
| colspan=4 align=center | 
|}

326401–326500 

|-bgcolor=#f2f2f2
| colspan=4 align=center | 
|}

326501–326600 

|-bgcolor=#f2f2f2
| colspan=4 align=center | 
|}

326601–326700 

|-bgcolor=#f2f2f2
| colspan=4 align=center | 
|}

326701–326800 

|-bgcolor=#f2f2f2
| colspan=4 align=center | 
|}

326801–326900 

|-bgcolor=#f2f2f2
| colspan=4 align=center | 
|}

326901–327000 

|-bgcolor=#f2f2f2
| colspan=4 align=center | 
|}

References 

326001-327000